The Saint Lucia Silver Division (formerly known as the Silver Division) is the second tier of Saint Lucian football.

2
2
Saint